Distorsio muehlhaeusseri is a species of medium-sized sea snail, a marine gastropod mollusk in the family Personidae, the Distortio snails.

Description
Original description: "Shell of medium size for the genus (max. mm 80), of a whitish colour. The whorls are less twisted (and consequently more regular) than in D. perdistorta. There are 8 main spiral cords, with several interstitial cordlets. The axial riblets number from 25 to 30 and form little nodules where they cross the spiral cords. The aperture (which is a very important feature in Distorsio for differentiation at specific level) is small and the white to brownish parietal shield is thicker and of a clearly darker colour in the Somali specimens than in the Philippine ones. The external lip is wide but the profile of its external edge is straight, almost parallel to the axis of the shell, except at the inferior end which bends sharply towards the siphonal canal."

Distribution
Locus typicus: "Deep water off Bohol Island, Philippines."

This marine species occurs off Somalia.

References

 Parth M. (1990). Distorsio muehlhaeusseri, a new indopacific species (Gastropoda: Ranellidae). La Conchiglia. 22(253-255): 18-20
 Liu J.Y. [Ruiyu] (ed.) (2008). Checklist of marine biota of China seas. China Science Press. 1267 pp.

External links
 Kronenberg G.C. (1994). A review of the Personidae Gray, 1854, with the description of Distorsio ventricosa spec. nov. / Een overzicht van de Personidae Gray, 1854, met de beschrijving van Distorsio ventricosa spec. nov. (Molusca: Gastropoda). Vita Marina. 42(3): 57-103

Endemic fauna of Somalia
Personidae
Gastropods described in 1990